Sobralia macrophylla, commonly known as the large-leafed sobralia, is a species of orchid found from Central America to  tropical South America.

See also

macrophylla
Orchids of Central America
Orchids of South America